Editura Curtea Veche (Curtea Veche Publishing House) is a Romanian publishing house with a tradition in editing works of Romanian literature. After the Romanian Revolution of 1989, Curtea Veche started editing more foreign books, such as BBC reports or The Complete Idiot's Guide to....

External links
 Editura Curtea Veche (official site)

Book publishing companies of Romania
Companies based in Bucharest